This is a sub-article to Białystok
Metropolitan Białystok - a metropolitan area designated by the Governor of the Regulation No. 52/05 of 16 May 2005  in order to help economically develop the region.

In 2006, the metropolitan area population was 450,254 inhabitants. Covering the area of 1.521 km ², it had population density of  about 265 people per one km2. Among urban residents were more women - 192 thousand. on 100 men, 108 women on average. 

The municipalities adjacent to Białystok are slowly losing their agricultural character, becoming the residential suburban neighborhoods.

The metropolitan area includes:
 the city of Białystok,
 the villages in Gmina Choroszcz:
Jeroniki, Klepacze, Krupniki, Łyski, Porosły, Sienkiewicze and Turczyn,
 the villages in Gmina Dobrzyniewo Duże:
Bohdan, Borsukówka, Chraboły, Dobrzyniewo Duże, Dobrzyniewo Fabryczne*, Dobrzyniewo Kościelne*, Fasty*, Gniła, Jaworówka, Kozińce, Kulikówka, Krynice, Letniki, Leńce, Nowe Aleksandrowo*, Obrubniki, Ogrodniki*, Pogorzałki, Ponikła, Podleńce, Szaciły and Zalesie
 the villages in Gmina Juchnowiec Kościelny:
Bronczany, Izabelin, Kleosin, Księżyno, Kolonia Księżyno, Koplany, Kolonia Koplany, Lewickie, Niewodnica Nargilewska, Solniczki and Stanisławowo
 the city of Supraśl and the villages in Gmina Supraśl:
Grabówka, Henrykowo, Karakule and Ogrodniczki
 the city of Wasilków and the villages in Gmina Wasilków:
Dąbrówki, Katrynka, Jurowce*, Osowicze*, Sochonie*, Studzianki, Nowodworce*, Sielachowskie*, Wólka Poduchowna, Wólka-Przedmieście and Woroszyły,
 the villages in Gmina Zabłudów:
Halickie, Kuriany and Skrybicze

* village added via Regulation No. 2 / 2008 of 28 January 2008 amending the Decree of 29 September 2006 on the designation of Metropolitan Białystok.

See also
 Metropolitan areas in Poland

References

Metropolitan areas of Poland
Geography of Podlaskie Voivodeship